Madisonville is a neighborhood in Cincinnati, Ohio. The population was 9,141 at the 2010 census.

History
Madisonville was established in 1809 and originally named Madison after the newly elected James Madison, the fourth president of the United States. Prior to 1809, European-American settlers began to arrive in the territory, mostly from the mid-Atlantic and New England states. In 1826, the post office was named Madisonville, in order to avoid confusion with other towns.

The first permanent settler was Joseph Ward, a sixty-five-year-old American Revolutionary War veteran from New Jersey. Joseph and his two sons, Usual and Israel, came overland by horseback intending to settle in the new outpost of Columbia. Joseph's wife, Phebia, and other sons and daughters traveled by flatboat down the Ohio River to reunite at Columbia.

Seeing the flooding at that location, they decided to go up higher and settled in what was to become Madisonville. Joseph and his sons built the first house, a log cabin, in 1797 along a well-known Native American trail near what is now Whetsel and Monning Avenue.

In 1830, the population of the village was 284. In 1900, the population of Madisonville was reported to be 3,140.  Madisonville was annexed by the City of Cincinnati in 1911.

Demographics

References

External links 
Madisonville Community Council

Neighborhoods in Cincinnati
1809 establishments in Ohio
Populated places established in 1809